Tomáš Frühwald (born 23 September 2002) is a Slovak professional footballer who plays for Ružomberok as a goalkeeper.

Club career

MFK Ružomberok
Frühwald made his Fortuna Liga debut for Ružomberok against ŠKF Sereď at Štadión pod Čebraťom on 21 May 2022, he conceded one goal in the match from the penalty.

References

External links
 MFK Ružomberok official profile 
 Futbalnet profile 
 
 

2002 births
Living people
Slovak footballers
Association football goalkeepers
MFK Ružomberok players
Slovak Super Liga players